Football Northern Territory (FNT) is the state governing body for soccer in the Northern Territory, Australia. It is affiliated with Football Australia, the national governing body. The Territory is also separated into three zones – Northern, Central and FICA (Southern) – which have their own zone councils which administer leagues locally running their own league and cup competitions.

There is currently no overall champion – the regional winners in 2016 were Hellenic Athletic Club (Northern Zone) and Celtic (FICA).

The federation conducts the territory-wide Sport Minister's Cup, which doubles as qualification for the national FFA Cup.

Clubs in NT

Northern Zone (NorZone)

 Casuarina FC 
 Darwin Olympic
 Darwin Hearts
 Hellenic Athletic
 Mindil Aces
 Port Darwin
 University Azzurri

Reserves Only
 Palmerston Rovers
 Garuda FC
 Litchfield SC

Past Participant Clubs
 Darwin City Buffalos 
 Darwin Lions (Pre-2007 known as Afro-Oz FC)
 Karama United
 Litchfield SC
 1st Brigade
 Palmerston FC
 University Rangers
 Waratahs SC (2007 No longer a Registered Club)
 Greater Palmerston United
 Darwin Rovers

Central Zone 
Borroloola FC
Gove SC
Katherine FC

Southern Zone Premier League
Organised by Football in Central Australia (FICA)
Alice Springs Celtic
Stormbirds SC
Verdi FC
MPH Vikings FC

Reserves Only
Gillen Scorpions

Past Participant Clubs 
Gillen Scorpions
Federals SC
ASFA – (Not registered club, Academy team)
Buckleys FC (Pre-2007 known as Town and Country Tavern)

NT Australia Cup Final

The male knock-out cup – now run annually with clubs from NorZone and FICA – is a single-leg knockout cup competition, first held as part of the preliminary rounds of the 2015 FFA Cup. It is the qualification route for the single NT federation representative for the FFA Cup, now known as the Australia Cup.

Since 2016 the final has been played for the Cup.

From 2015 to 2018 the winners of the NorZone and FICA met in the final; since 2019 the winners of FICA have qualified to the semi-final stage (FFA Cup preliminary Round 6).

See also
Darwin Football Stadium
NorZone Premier League

References

External links
Football Northern Territory Official website

North
 
Sports governing bodies in the Northern Territory
Sports organizations established in 2005
2005 establishments in Australia